Andries Gous (born 24 November 1993) is a South African cricketer. He was included in the Free State cricket team for the 2015 Africa T20 Cup. In August 2017, he was named in Jo'burg Giants' squad for the first season of the T20 Global League. The following month, he scored a century for Free State in the semi-final of the 2017 Africa T20 Cup against Namibia.

In September 2018, Gous was named in Free State's squad for the 2018 Africa T20 Cup. He was the joint-leading run-scorer for Free State in the tournament, with 155 runs in four matches. In September 2019, he was named in Free State's squad for the 2019–20 CSA Provincial T20 Cup.

In April 2021, Gous moved to the United States after signing a three-year deal to play cricket. In June 2021, he was selected to take part in the Minor League Cricket tournament in the United States following the players' draft.

References

External links
 

1993 births
Living people
South African cricketers
Free State cricketers
Sportspeople from Welkom
Wicket-keepers